G28 may refer to:
 BMW i3 (G28), an electric vehicle
 
 
 Gribovsky G-28, a Soviet aircraft
 Heckler & Koch G28, a German battle rifle
 G28 - Auto Home, a G-code from Marlin used for homing a 3D printer